William Walker  (born Stepney, London, 3 March 1939) is a British retired heavyweight boxer and actor. He turned professional in 1961 after 39 amateur bouts. His nickname was "Golden Boy". His professional record was 21 wins (16 by knockout), 8 losses and 2 draws. During 1967, he fought for both the British and European titles, losing to Henry Cooper (Great Britain) and Karl Mildenberger (West Germany) respectively. After he retired from the ring in 1969 he appeared in several British films and TV shows. His autobiography When the Gloves Came Off was published in 2007.

Early life and family
William Walker is the son of William James Walker, a brewery worker, drayman at Watney's brewery, and wife (Limehouse, April/June 1925) Ellen Louisa Page (Southwark, October/December 1903 – ?). He is the youngest of three brothers.

During World War II, his father served in the Royal Air Force and the boys lived with their mother in Bedfordshire, and later in Ilford, Essex. He left school at 16 and started working in the printing business. Later a friend introduced him to a more highly paid job as a porter in London's historic Billingsgate Fish Market. He was also a bouncer and part-time DJ at the Ilford Palais dance hall which was managed by Jimmy Savile at the time. He joined a West Ham boxing club to keep fit, and was eventually persuaded to spar with other members and found that he had the talent to box competitively.

Amateur career
Walker's older brother George had been a successful light heavyweight boxer and persuaded him to enter the sport, with the ambition eventually to turn professional.
With his natural ability, and George's guidance, within three years he had won the British (ABA) Amateur Heavyweight title. Soon after a first-round knockout of  American Cornelius Perry in an international tournament broadcast on national TV, promoters were competing to sign Walker to lucrative contracts. About this time the media started calling him "The Golden Boy" and "The Blond Bomber".

Billy refused a rematch with Derry heavyweight Jim Monaghan after a disputed first-round TKO in a four-nations competition in Dublin 1961. Monaghan had Walker bleeding heavily from the nose from a steady hard jab before the ref prematurely stopped the fight when Monaghan got caught with a right to the body. Monaghan was never knocked out as an amateur or pro.

Professional career
With brother George as his manager, Walker embarked on a professional career that in six years would see him challenging for both the British and European titles. With his curly blond hair, boyish good looks and all action style the public flocked to see his fights. George invested the purses in a string of night clubs and restaurants and soon the brothers were rich. Billy Walker moved to London's West End and mixed with society's elite. On one occasion he was presented to the Queen, who told him that she enjoyed watching his fights. This was during London's "swinging sixties" and Walker took full advantage of his wealth, fame and good looks to have fun with a series of beautiful women.  Although he never fought in the US, during his career he stopped rated American heavyweights Charlie Powell, Bowie Adams, Ray Patterson and Thad Spencer inside the distance. In spite of a few weeks' coaching at Harry's Gym in Harlem, Walker's defensive skills remained marginal, and some of his later fights against world class opponents had to be stopped owing to cuts and excessive bleeding from his nose. In 1969 at the age of 30 he retired from the ring, a very wealthy young man.

Business life

When Billy Walker retired from boxing, George Walker continued to run their business empire as though it were his alone. This soon led to disputes and eventually they parted company.
Billy Walker retained enough assets to live very comfortably, with various business interests of his own, including Billy's Baked Potato, a chain of fast food outlets. He also played comedy roles in two Frankie Howerd films, Up Pompeii and Up the Chastity Belt in 1971. Changing financial conditions a few years later forced him to look for other income. He moved to Jersey, a tax haven in the Channel Islands and became a successful property developer. George Walker went on to become a tycoon in the UK gambling and film industries with his Brent Walker Group but he too suffered a reversal of fortune, but later developing new business interests in Russia before dying of a heart attack in the South of France in March 2011.

He has been active on the speaking circuit and is an honorary steward for the British Boxing
Board of Control. He collaborated with the Kray twins' confidant and writer Robin McGibbon on his autobiography When the Gloves Came Off, which was published in 2007.

Marriages and issue

In 1968, Billy Walker married Susan Coleopy and they had two children, Daniel and Clare. They divorced in 1977.

In September 1979 his girlfriend Chrissie gave birth to a son, Warren, but she opted to bring him up on her own. They are still on good terms.

He married Jackie in 1981. They also had two children, Kelly and Thomas (Tom), but divorced in the 1990s.

In 1997 he married Patricia but she died of cancer in 2003.

Walker is married to his fourth wife, Susan, whom he had known from his time in Jersey about thirty years previously. They live in Essex.

Professional boxing record

|-
|align="center" colspan=8|21 Wins (16 knockouts, 3 decisions, 2 DQ), 8 Losses (5 knockouts, 2 decisions, 1 DQ), 2 Draws 
|-
| align="center" style="border-style: none none solid solid; background: #e3e3e3"|Result
| align="center" style="border-style: none none solid solid; background: #e3e3e3"|Record
| align="center" style="border-style: none none solid solid; background: #e3e3e3"|Opponent
| align="center" style="border-style: none none solid solid; background: #e3e3e3"|Type
| align="center" style="border-style: none none solid solid; background: #e3e3e3"|Round
| align="center" style="border-style: none none solid solid; background: #e3e3e3"|Date
| align="center" style="border-style: none none solid solid; background: #e3e3e3"|Location
| align="center" style="border-style: none none solid solid; background: #e3e3e3"|Notes
|-align=center
|Loss
|
|align=left| Jack Bodell
|TKO
|8
|25 March 1969
|align=left| Empire Pool, Wembley, London
|align=left|
|-
|Win
|
|align=left| Thad Spencer
|TKO
|6
|12 November 1968
|align=left| Empire Pool, Wembley, London
|align=left|
|-
|Loss
|
|align=left| Henry Cooper
|TKO
|6
|7 November 1967
|align=left| Empire Pool, Wembley, London
|align=left|
|-
|Loss
|
|align=left| Karl Mildenberger
|TKO
|8
|21 March 1967
|align=left| Empire Pool, Wembley, London
|align=left|
|-
|Win
|
|align=left| Giulio Rinaldi
|DQ
|1
|13 February 1967
|align=left| Belle Vue Zoological Gardens, Belle Vue, Manchester
|align=left|
|-
|Win
|
|align=left| Ray Patterson
|TKO
|8
|6 December 1966
|align=left| Royal Albert Hall, Kensington, London
|align=left|
|-
|Win
|
|align=left| Jose Menno
|TKO
|10
|25 October 1966
|align=left| Royal Albert Hall, Kensington, London
|align=left|
|-
|Win
|
|align=left| Horst Benedens
|TKO
|1
|20 September 1966
|align=left| Empire Pool, Wembley, London
|align=left|
|-
|Win
|
|align=left| Bowie Adams
|KO
|3
|2 May 1966
|align=left| Belle Vue Zoological Gardens, Belle Vue, Manchester
|align=left|
|-
|Win
|
|align=left| Lars Olaf Norling
|TKO
|4
|31 March 1966
|align=left| London Hilton on Park Lane Hotel, Mayfair, London
|align=left|
|-
|Loss
|
|align=left| Hector Eduardo Corletti
|TKO
|8
|19 October 1965
|align=left| Empire Pool, Wembley, London
|align=left|
|-
|Draw
|
|align=left| Hector Eduardo Corletti
|PTS
|10
|19 August 1965
|align=left| Ariston Theatre, Sanremo, Liguria
|align=left|
|-
|Loss
|
|align=left| Brian London
|PTS
|10
|30 March 1965
|align=left| Empire Pool, Wembley, London
|align=left|
|-
|Win
|
|align=left| Chuck Powell
|KO
|2
|26 January 1965
|align=left| London Olympia, Kensington, London
|align=left|
|-
|Win
|
|align=left| Joe Erskine
|PTS
|10
|27 October 1964
|align=left| Empire Pool, Wembley, London
|align=left|
|-
|Win
|
|align=left| Bill Nielsen
|KO
|2
|12 May 1964
|align=left| Empire Pool, Wembley, London
|align=left|
|-
|Loss
|
|align=left| Bill Nielsen
|TKO
|8
|10 March 1964
|align=left| Royal Albert Hall, Kensington, London
|align=left|
|-
|Win
|
|align=left| Joe Bygraves
|DQ
|6
|28 January 1964
|align=left| London Olympia, Kensington, London
|align=left|
|-
|Loss
|
|align=left| Johnny Prescott
|PTS
|10
|12 November 1963
|align=left| Empire Pool, Wembley, London
|align=left|
|-
|Win
|
|align=left| Johnny Prescott
|TKO
|10
|10 September 1963
|align=left| Royal Albert Hall, Kensington, London
|align=left|
|-
|Win
|
|align=left| Kurt Stroer
|TKO
|2
|24 June 1963
|align=left| Market hall, Carmarthen
|align=left|
|-
|Win
|
|align=left| Jose Mariano Moracia Ibanes
|PTS
|8
|11 June 1963
|align=left| Royal Albert Hall, Kensington, London
|align=left|
|-
|Win
|
|align=left| Joe DeGrazio
|KO
|3
|26 March 1963
|align=left| Empire Pool, Wembley, London
|align=left|
|-
|Win
|
|align=left| Peter Bates
|KO
|2
|29 January 1963
|align=left| London Olympia, Kensington, London
|align=left|
|-
|Win
|
|align=left| José González Sales
|PTS
|8
|26 November 1962
|align=left| Belle Vue Zoological Gardens, Belle Vue, Manchester
|align=left|
|-
|Loss
|
|align=left| José González Sales
|DQ
|3
|20 November 1962
|align=left| Leicester, Leicestershire
|align=left|
|-
|Win
|
|align=left| Phonse LaSaga
|KO
|1
|13 November 1962
|align=left| Empire Pool, Wembley, London
|align=left|
|-
|Win
|
|align=left| Robert Archie Moore
|KO
|2
|6 September 1962
|align=left| Liverpool Stadium, Liverpool, Merseyside
|align=left|
|-
|Win
|
|align=left| Erwin Hack
|TKO
|1
|14 August 1962
|align=left| Blackpool, Lancashire
|align=left|
|-
|Draw
|
|align=left| Jose Mariano Moracia Ibanes
|PTS
|8
|22 May 1962
|align=left| Empire Pool, Wembley, London
|align=left|
|-
|Win
|
|align=left| Jose Peyre
|TKO
|5
|27 March 1962
|align=left| Empire Pool, Wembley, London
|align=left|
|}

References

External links
 
 
 http://heirsofeurope.blogspot.pt/search/label/Mountbatten

People from Stepney
1939 births
Boxers from Greater London
English male boxers
Heavyweight boxers
England Boxing champions
English male film actors
English businesspeople
Living people